Abattoir was an American speed metal band founded in 1982 which went through a number of lineup changes.

Their first recording appearance was on Metal Massacre IV in 1983, during a time when their vocalist was John Cyriis, who later went to found Agent Steel. Juan Garcia, and Steve Gaines went on to be involved in other metal bands, including Evildead and Tactics. Future L.A. Guns founder Michael Jagosz was also briefly a vocalist for Abattoir during the early days.

On February 17 and 19, 1984, Abattoir was the opening act of what would be the first ever Megadeth live shows.

Discography
Vicious Attack (1985)
The Only Safe Place (1986)
No Sleep 'til Kalamazoo - Live! (live, 2001)

References 

American power metal musical groups
Musical groups established in 1982
1982 establishments in California
Noise Records artists
Combat Records artists